Tatjana Viktorovna Bibik (born 16 April 1985) is a Russian badminton player. She won bronze medals at the European Mixed Team Badminton Championships in 2009, 2011 and 2013 with the Russian national badminton team.

Achievements

BWF Grand Prix (1 title, 2 runners-up) 
The BWF Grand Prix has two level such as Grand Prix and Grand Prix Gold. It is a series of badminton tournaments, sanctioned by Badminton World Federation (BWF) since 2007.

Women's Singles

Women's Doubles

Mixed Doubles

 BWF Grand Prix Gold tournament
 BWF Grand Prix tournament

BWF International Challenge/Series (11 titles, 8 runners-up) 
Women's singles

Women's doubles

Mixed doubles

  BWF International Challenge tournament
  BWF International Series tournament
  BWF Future Series tournament

References

External links
 
 

1985 births
Living people
Russian female badminton players
21st-century Russian women